Mount Mora Cemetery is the oldest public cemetery in St. Joseph, Missouri.  Among those who are buried in the cemetery are three governors, a U.S. senator, soldiers from both sides in the American Civil War and riders of the Pony Express.  In October 2006, several headstones including that of Missouri governor Silas Woodson were damaged by vandals.

The cemetery was added to the National Register of Historic Places in July 2006.

Notable interments
 Daniel Dee Burnes (1851–1899) – US Representative
 James N. Burnes (1827–1889) – US Representative
 James Craig (1818–1888) – Civil War general and US Representative
 Willard Preble Hall (1820-1882) – Governor of Missouri
 Benjamin F. Loan (1819–1881) – US Representative and Union general
 William Ridenbaugh (1821–1874) – St. Joseph Gazette founder
 Robert Marcellus Stewart (1815–1871) – Governor of Missouri
 M. Jeff Thompson (1826–1876) – Confederate general known as the "Swamp Fox"
 Robert Wilson (1803–1870) – US Senator
 Sir William Wiseman (1814–1874) – British Rear Admiral
 Silas Woodson (1819–1896) – Governor of Missouri
 Huston Wyeth (1863–1925) – industrialist

See also
 List of Registered Historic Places in Missouri, Counties A-B#Buchanan County

References

External links
 
 
 St. Joe arts profile
 Tours
 Political graveyard history

Cemeteries on the National Register of Historic Places in Missouri
Buildings and structures in St. Joseph, Missouri
Protected areas of Buchanan County, Missouri
National Register of Historic Places in Buchanan County, Missouri